A duiker  is a small to medium-sized brown antelope native to sub-Saharan Africa.

Duiker may also refer to:
 Duiker (surname), a Dutch and Afrikaans surname
 Duiker Island, an island off Hout Bay near Cape Town South Africa